Oberholzklau is a constituent community of Freudenberg, Siegen-Wittgenstein, North Rhine-Westphalia, Germany.

The first documentary mention of the village under the name of Holzeclaen dates from 1079, the parish of Oberholzklau was first mentioned in 1329.

The district currently has 622 inhabitants. It borders the Freudenberg districts of Niederholzklau and Bühl as well as the Siegen district of Meiswinkel. The road L 564 leads through the village.

On January 1, 1969 Oberholzklau became a district of the city of Freudenberg.

External links
 Heimat und Verschönerungsverein e.V.
 Oberholzklau in the Kulturatlas Westfalen

Former municipalities in North Rhine-Westphalia
Siegen-Wittgenstein